Minifigures is a 2010 Lego theme based on a set of collectible Lego minifigures. Each figure is an original character with new clothing and facial designs, and most contain previously unseen accessories. Each series usually contained 16 different minifigures; however, some series contain as few as 9 minifigures, while others contain up to 22. Since 2021, the number of different minifigures for a series is set to 12.

Overview

The series consists of a number of individually themed collectible Lego minifigures based on movies, sports, history, and popular culture. The figures are sold individually in sealed, unmarked packets, giving customers a random chance at obtaining any particular figurine. While considered a novel approach by some, it has raised controversy amongst enthusiasts and collectors, increasing the amount of difficulty in obtaining a complete collection. Purchases from many retailers make no guarantees regarding the contents of a particular packet. Despite attempts to obfuscate the contents of these packets, the bags of Series 1 and 2 have a second figurine-specific bar code on the rear of the packet, next to the EAN/UPC product bar code (which is unique to each series). This has allowed customers to identify individual figures within the packet, significantly decreasing the amount of money and effort required to obtain a complete collection, and eliminates the possibility of unintentionally receiving duplicates. There are also apps for both iPhone and Android devices that utilize these bar codes.

Lego has eliminated the figurine-specific bar codes on all Series 3 and 4 packets and replaced them with a braille-like system of dots embossed in the lower seal of the bag. In theory, this will allow customers to continue identifying the figure enclosed within. Later series do not have any markings to indicate their contents.

On average a new series has been released every four months. Release dates sometimes vary between countries.

In September 2021, Matthew Ashton, The Lego Group's Vice President of Design announced the Collectible Minifigures alongside City, Friends, Creator, Lego Classic, Technic, Speed Champions, Monkie Kid, Ninjago and DOTS themes were continue until at least 2023.

Development 
During the development process of the Lego Minifigures theme, Lego designers Tara Wike explained the concept of the Lego Minifigures theme. Tara Wike explained, "Here’s a good example I’ll go to Austin and say, “let’s do an elephant girl”, and he’ll doodle that up and we’ll go brief the sculptors. And it’s usually not just out of thin air, we’ve done some other animal helmets before, so we’ve got some experience with that. We’ll have a rough wish, but we know that we’ll have limitations, and we go to the sculptors and they come back with their proposal, and we always have a mould engineer sitting in on our weekly design meeting so that they can flag things right away. But our sculptures are actually very good at knowing what we can get in and out of a mould."

Collectible Minifigures 
According to Bricklink, The Lego Group has released 784 Collectible Minifigures.

Collectible Minifigures of the series released so far.

Online games

LEGO Minifigures Online

On 29 August 2013, Funcom officially announced a massively multiplayer online game based on the Minifigures theme, in which there are several worlds the player can travel to and fight enemies, as well as dungeons based on the setting. The game used traditional click-to-move mechanics, allowing younger users to jump into the action. However, for advanced users, there were special abilities activated using the number pad. It was going to be free-to-play, but you could unlock Minifigures by purchasing one and entering a code, however they could also be obtained in-game. It was released in late 2014 for iOS, Android, and PC as either a download client or in-browser on the LEGO website.

Funcom announced that LEGO Minifigures Online would be closing on 30 September 2016. Starting 6 June 2016, new players will be unable to join the game and the in-game chat will be disabled. Existing players would still be able to play up until 30 September 2016.

Other merchandise
In 2022, The Lego Minifigures brand has also produced Plush Toy Collection.

Awards and nominations 
In 2022, Lego Marvel Series Collectible Minifigures (set number: 71031) was awarded "Toy of the Year" and also "Collectible of the Year" by the Toy Association.

In September 2022, The Muppets (set number: 71033) was awarded "Toy of the Year" and also "Collectible of the Year" by the Toy Association.

References

External links
 LEGO Minifigures Official Webpage 

Minifigures (Theme), Lego
Products introduced in 2010